Procamallanus is a genus of nematodes belonging to the family Camallanidae.

The genus has almost cosmopolitan distribution.

Species:

Procamallanus alii 
Procamallanus anguillae 
Procamallanus annipetterae 
Procamallanus annulatus 
Procamallanus ashouri 
Procamallanus barlowi 
Procamallanus belenensis 
Procamallanus berdii 
Procamallanus bothi 
Procamallanus brevis 
Procamallanus caballeroi 
Procamallanus caranxi 
Procamallanus chaimha 
Procamallanus chetumalensis 
Procamallanus colei 
Procamallanus crossorhombi 
Procamallanus cruzi 
Procamallanus cumanensis 
Procamallanus diacanthum 
Procamallanus dispar 
Procamallanus ditchelli 
Procamallanus dussumieri 
Procamallanus elatensis 
Procamallanus garnotus 
Procamallanus gobiomori 
Procamallanus guttatusi 
Procamallanus halitrophus 
Procamallanus hexophtalmatis 
Procamallanus hilarii 
Procamallanus huacraensis 
Procamallanus incognitus 
Procamallanus inopinatus 
Procamallanus istiblenni 
Procamallanus jaliscensis
Procamallanus jiriensis 
Procamallanus johnsoni 
Procamallanus juana 
Procamallanus kakinadensis 
Procamallanus kalingapatnamensis 
Procamallanus karachiensis 
Procamallanus laeviconchus 
Procamallanus lamellari 
Procamallanus longus 
Procamallanus lonis 
Procamallanus lutjanusi 
Procamallanus macaensis 
Procamallanus mehrii 
Procamallanus mexicanus
Procamallanus monotaxis 
Procamallanus neobuccalaris 
Procamallanus neocaballeroi 
Procamallanus olseni 
Procamallanus otolithi 
Procamallanus pacificus 
Procamallanus pakistanensis 
Procamallanus papillicaudatus 
Procamallanus paraguayensis 
Procamallanus partitus 
Procamallanus pereirai 
Procamallanus phillippinensis 
Procamallanus pimelodus 
Procamallanus pintoi 
Procamallanus planoratus 
Procamallanus platycephali 
Procamallanus plumierus 
Procamallanus problematicus 
Procamallanus pseudospiralis 
Procamallanus rebecae 
Procamallanus rigbyi 
Procamallanus sigani 
Procamallanus similis 
Procamallanus sinespinis 
Procamallanus slomei 
Procamallanus soodi 
Procamallanus sparus 
Procamallanus sphaeroconchus 
Procamallanus spiculastriatus 
Procamallanus spiculogubernaculus
Procamallanus spinicaudatus 
Procamallanus spiralis 
Procamallanus synodi 
Procamallanus thalassomatis 
Procamallanus tomsici 
Procamallanus tornquisti 
Procamallanus variolae 
Procamallanus visakhapatnamensis

References

Nematodes